Hicks is an unincorporated community in Hardin County, Illinois, United States. Hicks is north of Rosiclare and Elizabethtown.

References

Unincorporated communities in Hardin County, Illinois
Unincorporated communities in Illinois